KRBL Limited is an Indian rice processing and exporting company, and the world's largest rice miller. It is best known for its India Gate brand of basmati rice, which is the largest selling rice brand in India. The company exports rice to over 80 countries; about 75% of its export revenue comes from the Middle East countries, as of 2018.

History
KRBL was founded in 1889 in Lyallpur by two brothers–Khushi Ram and Behari Lal; the company name is an acronym of their names. Initially set up as a cotton-spinning (or perhaps cotton ginning) business, it also had business interests in edible oil, wheat and rice. After the partition of India, the family settled in Delhi and started again from scratch, working as trade agents of rice and oil in the city's Naya Bazaar area. 

By the 1970s, KRBL was producing only rice, and supplying to local exporters including the Zee Group. The company began exporting rice directly, in its own name, only in 1985. In 1992, it set up its first unit in Ghaziabad, UP, in the outskirts of Delhi. This unit was for sorting, grading and packaging rice. In 1995, KRBL issued its initial public offering. In 1998, the company launched its own brand of rice, "India Gate," in the Indian market. In 1998, the company commissioned its second plant (sorting, grading, packaging ogf rice) in Alipur, Delhi. In 2001, the third plant was set up in Gautam Buddh Nagar, UP (again in the outskirts of Delhi).

They year 2003 was a milestone year for the company. In that year, KRBL became the first Indian rice company to receive foreign investment, and in 2006, it issued GDRs of 13 million. It was also in 2003 that KRBL acquired a 65-acre rice processing, grading and packaging plant near Dhuri for 15.8 crore through a court auction. The facility was turned into the largest rice milling plant in the world after a 200 crore upgrade. In 2016, the company started operating its fourth plant, located in Sonipat district of Haryana.

Controversy
The company was named in a chargesheet filed by the Enforcement Directorate (ED) in December 2020 in relation to a money laundering case linked with Embraer. In January 2021, the ED arrested KRBL's joint managing director Anoop Kumar Gupta in connection to the AgustaWestland bribery scandal.

See also
 Pusa 1121 rice

References

Food and drink companies established in 1889
Rice organizations
Companies based in Noida
Indian brands
Food and drink companies of India
Companies listed on the National Stock Exchange of India
Companies listed on the Bombay Stock Exchange